Red Banks is the former name of an unincorporated area in Shenandoah County, Virginia, United States.

References

Geography of Shenandoah County, Virginia
Unincorporated communities in Virginia
Unincorporated communities in Shenandoah County, Virginia